Going by the Book is a 2007 South Korean film. This is a remake of the 1991 Japanese film Asobi no jikan wa owaranai (遊びの時間は終らない).

Plot 
Jung Do-man is a low-ranking traffic cop whose tendency to do things "by the book" sometimes gets him in trouble, such as when he pulls over his new boss, newly instated police chief Lee Seung-man, and issues him with a traffic ticket. Though surprised and annoyed by the unexpected fine, the police chief has bigger problems; the town of Sampo has been hit by a string of bank robberies, and to reassure the public he decides to carry out a realistic drill which will demonstrate the police force's capability. Do-man is chosen to act out the part of the bank robber, but with his usual fastidious attention to detail he sets out to commit the perfect crime.

Cast 
 Jung Jae-young ... Jung Do-man
 Son Byong-ho ... Lee Seung-man
 Uhm Soo-jung ... Han So-young
 Lee Young-eun ... Jeon Da-hye
 Ko Chang-seok ... Woo Jong-dae
 Lee Cheol-min ... Jo Seong-wook
 Shin Goo ... Do-man's father
 Lee Yong-yi ... Do-man's mother
 Im Ji-eun ... Kim Sung-mi
 Joo Jin-mo ... bank branch manager
 Lee Han-wi ... police force team leader
 Jo Deok-hyun ... adviser
 Kim Kyu-chul ... senior Kim
 Jo Shi-nae ... Miss Lee
 Son Byeong-wook - camera man
 Lee Moon-su - negotiator
 Lee Hae-yeong - Song Gyung-tae
 Kim Seung-hun - Detective #2
 Park Sung-il - SWAT 4
 Kong Ho-suk - old man
 Jin Yong-ok - bank robber 1

Release 
Going by the Book was released in South Korea on 18 October 2007, and topped the box office on its opening weekend with 464,699 admissions.

References

External links 
  
 
 
 

2000s crime comedy films
2000s heist films
2007 films
Films about bank robbery
2000s Korean-language films
South Korean crime comedy films
South Korean heist films
South Korean remakes of Japanese films
2007 comedy films
2000s South Korean films